"Electric Guitar" is the seventh single by the English electronic music band Fluke. Taken from the album, Six Wheels on My Wagon the track was released on 11 June 1993 at Circa in many formats but did not generate the same amount of interest as the previous single, Slid.

Versions

References 

Fluke (band) songs
1993 songs